Farnsleigh is a station stop on the RTA Blue Line in Shaker Heights, Ohio, located at the intersection of Farnsleigh Road and Van Aken Boulevard.

History
The station opened when the Van Aken line was extended east from Lynnfield Road. The extension used rail removed from Coventry Road between Shaker Boulevard and Fairmount Boulevard used to connect the Shaker line to the Cleveland streetcar system before 1920. The extension opened on July 30, 1930, at the same time that trains began using Cleveland Union Terminal.

In 1980 and 1981, the Green and Blue Lines were completely renovated with new track, ballast, poles and wiring, and new stations were built along the line. The renovated line along Van Aken Boulevard opened on October 30, 1981.

Station layout
The station comprises two side platforms west of the intersection. There is parking along the median on both sides of Van Aken Boulevard adjacent to the station. There is also a large parking lot on the north side of Shaker Boulevard.

Gallery

References

External links

Blue Line (RTA Rapid Transit)
Railway stations in the United States opened in 1930
1930 establishments in Ohio